The equestrian competition at the 2018 Mediterranean Games was held on 27 and 29 June at the Royal Polo Club of Barcelona in Barcelona.

Medal summary

Medal table

References

External links
2018 Mediterranean Games – Equestrian

Mediterranean Games
Sports at the 2018 Mediterranean Games
2018